Worlds is a live 1989 album by American jazz musician Joe Lovano. The album was recorded at the Amiens International Jazz Festival in France. The record was initially released in 1989 via Label Bleu in France and then re-released via Evidence Music in 1995 in the United States.

Reception
Alex Henderson of Allmusic wrote "Listeners whose first exposure to Joe Lovano was his Blue Note output of the 1990s might assume that Quartets (recorded at New York's famous Village Vanguard) was his first live album. But in fact, Worlds is a live recording that was made before Lovano signed with Blue Note and became a such a huge name in the jazz world. Recorded at the Amiens International Jazz Festival in France on May 5, 1989, Worlds finds the saxman leading a group that includes his wife, Judi Silvano, on vocals, Bill Frisell on guitar, Tim Hagans on trumpet, Gary Valente on trombone, Henri Texier on bass, and Paul Motian on drums. Lovano excels on the tenor and soprano saxes as well as the obscure alto clarinet, and Silvano's adventurous improvisations demonstrate that she was already quite distinctive in 1989; nor are Frisell's meaty solos anything to complain about. Nonetheless, this is hardly a performance that goes out of its way to be accessible -- classical-influenced post-bop pieces like "Tafabalewa Square," "Spirit of the Night," and "Round Dance" are as angular as they are cerebral and abstract. But if the listener is willing to accept this uncompromising, challenging CD on its own terms, the rewards are abundant.

Track listing

Personnel
Band
Joe Lovano – tenor and soprano saxophone, alto clarinet
Bill Frisell – guitar
Tim Hagans – trumpet
Gary Valente – trombone
Judi Silverman – soprano vocals
Henri Texier – double bass
Paul Motian – drums

Production
Bruno Menny – engineer
Alain Marnat – editing
Michel Orier – executive producer
Martine Patrice  – assistant producer
Bob Brookmeyer – liner notes
Guy Le Querrec – photography

References

External links
 

Blue Note Records live albums
Joe Lovano live albums
1989 live albums